Karen Doell (born 29 July 1965) is a Canadian softball player. She competed in the women's tournament at the 1996 Summer Olympics. Doell was inducted into the Manitoba Sports Hall of Fame in 2008.

References

External links
 

1965 births
Living people
Canadian softball players
Olympic softball players of Canada
Softball players at the 1996 Summer Olympics
Sportspeople from Winkler, Manitoba